The 1930 Belmont Stakes was the 62nd running of the Belmont Stakes. It was the 24th Belmont Stakes held at Belmont Park in Elmont, New York and was held on June 7, 1930. With a field of four horses, Gallant Fox, the winner of that year's Preakness Stakes and Kentucky Derby, clinched the U.S. Triple Crown when he won the 1 –mile race (12 f; 2.4 km) by 3 lengths over the odds-on favorite – Whichone.

Background
A June 3, 1930 Daily Racing Form story on the upcoming Belmont Stakes reported on the opinion of various horsemen as to whether it would be Whichone or Gallant Fox that would come out on top. The consensus was that Whichone would be the victor, the DRF stating it was important to note that for the most part the votes for the Whitney colt came from trainers and jockeys while those supporting Gallant Fox were handicappers and others who closely study horseracing. Among those jockeys and trainers who chose Whichone were future Hall of Fame inductees Laverne Fator, Mack Garner, Max Hirsch, Willie Knapp, and "Dick" Thompson.

Results

 Winning breeder: Belair Stud (MD)

References

External links 
BelmontStakes.com

Belmont Stakes races
Belmont Stakes
Belmont Stakes
Belmont Stakes